The 5th Directors Guild of America Awards, honoring the outstanding directorial achievements in film in 1952, were presented in 1953.

Winners and nominees

Film

Special awards

External links
 

Directors Guild of America Awards
1952 film awards
1952 television awards
1952 in American cinema
1952 in American television